Francis William "Dinty" Moore (October 29, 1900 – January 21, 1976) was a Canadian goaltender who competed in ice hockey at the 1936 Winter Olympics. He was born in Port Colborne, Ontario and died in Morgan's Point, Ontario.

Moore was a 1920 Memorial Cup Champion goalie with the Toronto Canoe Club Paddlers of the Ontario Hockey Association. He was a member of the 1936 Port Arthur Bearcats, which won the silver medal for Canada at the 1936 Winter Olympics. Following the Olympics, he played one season in the OHA Senior A League with the Toronto Goodyears.

Moore was president of the Ontario Hockey Association from 1942 through 1945. He was made a lifetime member of the Ontario Hockey Association in 1962.

Since 1976, the F. W. "Dinty" Moore Trophy has been given annually to the Ontario Hockey League rookie goaltender with the best regular season goals against average.

In 1987, Moore was inducted into the Northwestern Ontario Sports Hall of Fame as a member of the 1936 Olympic team.

References

External links
Olympics profile

1900 births
1976 deaths
Canadian ice hockey goaltenders
Ice hockey people from Ontario
Ice hockey players at the 1936 Winter Olympics
Medalists at the 1936 Winter Olympics
Olympic ice hockey players of Canada
Olympic medalists in ice hockey
Olympic silver medalists for Canada
Ontario Hockey Association executives
People from Port Colborne